Events from the year 1589 in France

Incumbents
 Monarch – Henry III (until August 2), then Henry IV

Events
 
1 August –Henry III was stabbed with a knife, and died the next day. Henry IV of France's succession was followed by a four-year long war.
15 to 16 September – Battle of Arques

Births
28 May – Robert Arnauld d'Andilly, Conseiller d'Etat (died 1674)

Full date missing
Jérôme Bignon, lawyer (died 1656)
Jean Sirmond, poet (died 1649)

Deaths
5 January – Catherine de' Medici, Italian noblewoman and Queen of France (born 1519 in Italy)
1 August – Jacques Clément, conspirator and the killer of king Henry III
2 August – Henry III of France, king (born 1551)
19 September – Jean-Antoine de Baïf, poet (born 1532)
 Charles Dançay, French diplomat (born 1510)

See also

References

1580s in France